Jathi Qullu (Aymara jathi heavy, qullu mountain, "heavy mountain", also spelled Hati Kkollu, Hati Kollu, Jathi Khollu, Jati Qollu) is a mountain in the Cordillera Real in the Bolivian Andes, about  high. It is situated in the Yanacachi Municipality, north-east of the city of La Paz. Jathi Qullu lies south of the mountain Sirk'i Qullu, north-west of Sura Qullu, east of Qutapata and north of Q'asiri.

References 

Mountains of La Paz Department (Bolivia)